Samuel Alwar Sundell (22 May 1906, in Kvevlax – 22 October 1990) was a Finnish Baptist pastor, peace activist and politician. He was a member of the Parliament of Finland from 1958 to 1966, representing the Swedish People's Party of Finland (SFP).

References

1906 births
1990 deaths
People from Korsholm
People from Vaasa Province (Grand Duchy of Finland)
Swedish-speaking Finns
Finnish Baptists
Swedish People's Party of Finland politicians
Members of the Parliament of Finland (1958–62)
Members of the Parliament of Finland (1962–66)
20th-century Baptists